Edmund Anthony Cutlar Purdom (19 December 19241 January 2009) was an English actor, voice artist, and director. He worked first on stage in Britain, performing various works by Shakespeare, then in America on Broadway and in Hollywood, and eventually in Italy. He is perhaps best known for his starring role in 1954's historical epic The Egyptian. 

By taking over important roles exited by Mario Lanza and Marlon Brando, Purdom was known by the mid-1950s as "The Replacement Star". After the failure of his Hollywood career, Purdom returned briefly to the United Kingdom and then settled in Italy, where he spent the remainder of his life appearing in local films. Between the 1970s and 1990s, he was a regular in European genre cinema, working with directors like Juan Piquer Simón, Joe D'Amato, Sergio Martino and Ruggero Deodato.
His daughter, Lilan Purdom, became a journalist for French TV Channel TF1. She is the author of the book Hollywood Garage, about her father's career.

Early life
Edmund Purdom was born in Welwyn Garden City, Hertfordshire, the youngest of four children of Charles Purdom, a London drama critic, and his wife, Lilian Antonia ( Cutlar).

Raised Catholic, Purdom was educated by Jesuits at St Ignatius College, Stamford Hill, and, later, by Benedictines at Downside School.

Career
He began his acting career in 1946 by joining the Northampton Repertory Company, appearing in productions that included Romeo and Juliet and Molière's The Imaginary Invalid. After two years of military service where he joined the Army's Central Pool of Artists, he joined the Royal Shakespeare Theatre at Stratford-upon-Avon for two seasons. Laurence Olivier saw Purdom and offered him a chance to tour in the U.S.

United States
In 1951–1952, Purdom appeared in small roles with the Laurence Olivier/Vivien Leigh company on Broadway in Shakespeare's Antony and Cleopatra and Shaw's Caesar and Cleopatra. His good looks brought him to the attention of Hollywood. Universal tested him for the part of the leading girl's brother in The Mississippi Gambler but decided he was too British. 20th Century Fox tested him for a role in My Cousin Rachel. MGM offered him a small role in Rhapsody, which he turned down. 

He made a screen test at Warner Brothers, directed by Michael Curtiz, from a scene from Force of Arms but Warners were not interested. As Purdom had left his play, he did not have the fare to return to Britain, so he decided to stay in Hollywood.

"I was so broke", Purdom recalled, "that I couldn't afford to pay the doctor's bill when my daughter was born. I had no money for bus fare. I had to walk from studio to studio looking for a job. Once we were evicted for not paying the rent."

MGM
He managed to get a small part in Julius Caesar at MGM. George Cukor recommended him to Charles Brackett for the small role of Charles Lightoller in Titanic (1953). This brought Purdom to the attention of executives at MGM who signed him to a long-term contract.

The Student Prince
Mario Lanza was fired from the lead role in a new version of The Student Prince (1954). Purdom was suggested for the part and he did a successful test, directed by George Sidney. He was cast opposite Ann Blyth. The film was directed by Richard Thorpe. Purdom lip-synched to Lanza's singing voice.

The Egyptian
Advance word on The Student Prince was promising, and when 20th Century Fox needed an actor at the last minute to replace Marlon Brando as the title character in The Egyptian, its most lavish production of 1954, Purdom was cast over John Derek, John Cassavetes and Cameron Mitchell.

MGM's head of production Dore Schary announced the studio would build up Purdom as a star. He was cast in three films: another MGM musical, Athena; the title role in the biblical epic The Prodigal, MGM's most lavish production of 1955, opposite Lana Turner; and the swashbuckler The King's Thief (1955), in a role originally meant for Stewart Granger. There was also some talk he would appear in the remake of Ben Hur.

The Student Prince was released and became a hit. Purdom was called "the most promising new star in Hollywood". Hedda Hopper called Purdom "the most surprising and notable figure this year in Hollywood...a fine actor in the great romantic tradition."

Leaving MGM
Schary later wrote in his memoirs that "Lanza's recordings were the prime ingredient for the picture's success, and that success went to Purdom's head. He believed he was responsible for the happy result. He asked for a new contract. We denied it. He asked for a release. We granted it."

Another contributing factor may have been that while The Student Prince had been a hit, The Egyptian was a box-office disappointment. Athena, The Prodigal and The King's Thief were all flops.

There was more bad publicity when he had an affair with Linda Christian (when she was married to Tyrone Power) leading to him divorcing his first wife. The split was bitter and public, and his wife later sued him for child support. Purdom argued for a reduction in child support because he no longer had his MGM contract worth $40,000 per year. He told the court he had renegotiated it in order to seek more money by freelancing and that he was in debt for $11,500. He said MGM had an option on his services for three films over three years. "It is my greatest desire to get back in front of the camera at the present time," he said.

He was announced for Loser Takes All (1956) but did not appear in the final film.
 
For Allied Artists, Purdom made Strange Intruder (1956) with Ida Lupino. In 1957, he married Alicia Darr, who later got in a brawl with Christian. He continued to be sued for debts by his ex-wife and his lawyers.

Purdom returned to Broadway, appearing in Child of Fortune, an adaptation of Henry James's The Wings of the Dove, for Jed Harris. Brooks Atkinson of The New York Times stated Purdom "plays the part of the faithless suitor like a cultivated gentleman but his style is heavy." The play closed after 23 performances.

Europe
In 1958, Purdom went back to the UK, where he played the lead role in Sword of Freedom (also known as Marco the Magnificent), a swashbuckler television series made for ITC Entertainment.

He then went to Italy, where the film industry was booming and there was a demand for English-speaking actors in order to ensure international distribution for the films. Purdom eventually settled permanently in Italy. His films included Herod the Great (1959), The Cossacks (1960), The Loves of Salammbo (1960), Suleiman the Conqueror (1961) and Nefertiti, Queen of the Nile (1961). He also occasionally worked in England on films such as Malaga (1960) and The Comedy Man (1964).

In 1962, he said "I couldn't stand Hollywood. The people, their status, symbols and public image were too much. I walked out. Perhaps I should have been more patient." Hedda Hopper wrote in response to this: "the truth is he did his best to become a star here, but he didn't make the grade – even with Mario Lanza's voice; but he did walk out on his wife and family and start gallivanting around with Linda Christian. I'll bet he'll come hopping back if anyone crooked a finger." He married Christian in 1962, but they divorced the following year.

He continued to work extensively in Italian B-films, on television and as a voice dubbing actor for many years (recording dialogue translated from Italian into English for sales of Italian films in English-speaking countries).

He had roles in TV movies and miniseries, such as Sophia Loren: Her Own Story (as Vittorio De Sica) and The Winds of War. In 1984, he came back to his native country to direct the horror film Don't Open till Christmas. He narrated a popular short documentary on the life of Padre Pio. He also narrated the 1997 documentary, 7 Signs of Christ's Return. His last role was in The Knights of the Quest (2001).

Death
Purdom died from heart failure on 1 January 2009 in Rome. He was survived by his fourth wife, Vivienne, a photographer, and his two daughters by his first wife.

Personal life

Purdom was married four times and divorced three times. 
 Anita "Tita" Phillips, the mother of his daughters, Lilan (born 11 October 1952) and Marina Ann (born 8 July 1954); they married in a Catholic wedding at the Brompton Oratory in London on 5 January 1951 and divorced on 5 March 1956
 Alicia Darr ( Barbara Kopczyńska; married/divorced 1957)
 Linda Christian (married in 1962; divorced in 1963)
 Vivienne Purdom, photographer (married from 2000 until his death in 2009)

Children
His elder daughter, Lilan Purdom, became a journalist with the French television channel TF1.

Selected filmography

Goodyear Playhouse (1952, TV series) – episode "The Medea Cup"
 Titanic (1953) – Second Officer Lightoller (uncredited)
 Julius Caesar (1953) – Strato
 The Student Prince (1954) – Prince Karl
 The Egyptian (1954) – Sinuhe
 Athena (1954) – Adam Calhorn Shaw
 The Prodigal (1955) – Micah
 The King's Thief (1955) – Michael Dermott
 Strange Intruder (1956) – Paul Quentin
 Trapped in Tangier (1957) – John Milwood
 Sword of Freedom (1957–1958, TV series) – Marco del Monte
 Herod the Great (1959) – Erode / Herodes
 The Diary of Anne Frank (1959) – British Radio Announcer (voice, uncredited)
 Tales of the Vikings (1959–1960, TV series) – Egil / King Lawrence
 Moment of Danger (1960, aka Malaga) – Peter Carran
 The Cossacks (1960) – Shamil, the Sheik
 The Loves of Salammbo (1960) – Narr Havas
 The Night They Killed Rasputin (1960) – Rasputin
 Fury of the Pagans (1960) – Toryok
 Big Request Concert (1960) – Harry Mell
 The Last of the Vikings (1961) – King Sveno
 La Fayette (1961) – Silas Deane
 Nefertiti, Queen of the Nile (1961) – Tumos, Scultore
 White Slave Ship (1961) – Dr. Bradley
 The Last Ride to Santa Cruz (1964) – Rex Kelly
 The Beauty Jungle (1964) – Rex Carrick
 The Comedy Man (1964) – Julian Baxter
 The Yellow Rolls-Royce (1964) – John Fane
 Heroes of Fort Worth (1965) – Patterson
 The Man Who Laughs (1966) – Cesare
 Sweden: Heaven and Hell (1968) – Narrator (English version)
 Blackie the Pirate (1971) – Viceroy
 The Fifth Cord (1971) – Edouard Vermont
 Lucifera: Demon Lover (1972) – Gunther
 Il Boss (1973) – Avvocato Rizzo (English version, voice, uncredited)
 The Big Family (1973) – Giovanni Lutture
 High Crime (1973) – Franco (English version, voice, uncredited)
 Frankenstein's Castle of Freaks (1974) – Prefect
 The Perfume of the Lady in Black (1974) – Andy (English version, voice, uncredited)
 What Have They Done to Your Daughters? (1974) – Prof. Beltrame (English version, voice, uncredited)
 The Suspects (1974) – Le journaliste américain
 The Cursed Medallion (1975) – Doctor
 Povero Cristo (1976) – Uomo in frac (man in tailcoat)
 A Matter of Time (1976) – (uncredited)
 Mister Scarface (1976) – Luigi Cherico
 The Concorde Affair (1979) – Danker
 Pensieri Morbosi (English title: Deep Thoughts) (1980) - The Pianist
 Absurd (1981) – Father
 Pieces (1982) – The Dean
 Ator, the Fighting Eagle (1982) – Griba
 Amok (1983) – Jaarsveld
 2019, After the Fall of New York (1983) – President of the Pan American Confederacy
 Champagne in paradiso (1983) – Paola's Father
 Don't Open till Christmas (1984) – Inspector Ian Harris
 The Assisi Underground (1985) – Cardinal Della Costa
 Who Is Afraid of Dracula? (1985) – Count Dracula
 Don Bosco (1988) – Urbano Rattazzi
 The Rift (1990) – CEO Steensland
 Un orso chiamato Arturo (1992)
 A Ray of Sun (1997) – voice of Renzo Rossellini
 Titanic: The Legend Goes On (2001) – voice of Jeremy McFlannel
 The Knights of the Quest (2001) – Hugh of Clarendon

Theatre credits
The Last of Mrs Cheyney (1950)
Anthony and Cleopatra (1951)
Caesar and Cleopatra (1951)

References

External links

1924 births
2009 deaths
English expatriates in Italy
English male film actors
English male stage actors
English male voice actors
People educated at Downside School
People educated at St Ignatius' College, Enfield
People from Welwyn Garden City
Male Spaghetti Western actors
Metro-Goldwyn-Mayer contract players
Male actors from Hertfordshire
Burials in the Protestant Cemetery, Rome
British expatriate male actors in the United States
20th-century British Army personnel